Igarka Airport  is an airport in Krasnoyarsk Krai, Russia, located  south of Igarka. It accommodates medium-sized airliners. The facility is fully paved and well-maintained, but is isolated on an island and depends on ice crossing or ferry service. The terminus of the Salekhard–Igarka Railway is located nearby.

Airlines and destinations

Accidents and incidents
On 3 August 2010, Katekavia Flight 9375 crashed on approach to Igarka. Twelve of the 15 people on board were killed.

References 

Airports built in the Soviet Union
Airports in Krasnoyarsk Krai
Turukhansky District